Barry Pinches (born 13 July 1970 in Catton, Norwich) is an English professional snooker player, recognisable for his bright and flamboyant waistcoats, which usually feature the yellow and green colours of Norwich City F.C. He is a former top 32 player and ranking-event quarter-finalist. He has compiled over 100 century breaks in his career, becoming the 33rd player to have done so. He has also made one maximum break.

Career
Pinches won the English Amateur Championship in 1988, enabling him to turn professional in 1989. He is coached by Stephen Feeney.

After a largely unsuccessful start to his career, he hit good form for a while in the 2000s. He defeated Jimmy White 10–8 in the 2004 World Championship, in a match which overran and had to be completed after other matches, then led Stephen Hendry 11–9 before losing 12–13 and has lost in the first round twice more – the 13-year gap between his first two Crucible appearances (1991–2004) is an all-time record. In his first appearance at the Crucible, in 1991 he lost 3–10 to Terry Griffiths. His best ranking tournament run to date, was in the 2003 UK Championship, where he reached the quarter-finals with victories over Marco Fu, Graeme Dott and Stephen Lee, before Stephen Hendry ended his run.

At one point he was established in the world's top 32, and provisionally 14 at one point – advancing 82–56–36–21 in the rankings over a strong sequence of seasons up to 2003–04. However, he dropped out of the top 32 two years later, and then won only one knock-out match in 2006–07, dropping to number #56. He attributed this loss of form to attempting to change his cue action. However, he won an invitational event that featured many top players, the 2007 Paul Hunter Classic that August, beating Neil Robertson and Ken Doherty en route.   
He also showed a return to form in the 2008 China Open by reaching the last 16, beating the defending champion, Graeme Dott 5–1 in the process, before going down by the same scoreline to Nigel Bond, who also beat him 7–10 in the final qualifying round of the 2008 World Championship. The 2008/2009 season was less successful for him however.

After reaching the final of Event 2 of the Players Tour Championship where he lost 3–4 to Mark Selby he went one better in Event 4 beating Mark Williams 4–1 and Ronnie O'Sullivan 4–3 in the semi-final and final respectively to record the best win of his career to date.

In the 2011–12 season Pinches narrowly missed out on a maximum 147 break at Event 2 of the Players Tour Championship in Gloucester, making it to the final black. 
He would later finish the season ranked world number 64, grabbing the final spot on offer through the world rankings to play in the 2012–13 season. He fell 23 places in the rankings during the season – the most of anyone on the snooker tour.

Pinches won two matches but then lost in the final round in qualifying for the first three ranking events of the season. He made it to the main draw at the next event, the 2012 International Championship, thanks to wins over Daniel Wells, Xiao Guodong and Joe Perry. He had to play in a wildcard round once at the venue in Chengdu, China, and lost 5–6 to Lu Ning. This was the furthest Pinches got in a ranking event this season, with it coming to an end when he was defeated 9–10 by Liam Highfield in the second round of World Championship Qualifying. He finished the year ranked world number 62.

Pinches qualified for the 2013 Indian Open, the fourth ranking event of the 2013–14 season with a 4–1 victory over Chris Wakelin. He almost pulled off a huge shock in the first round as he led Ding Junhui 3–2, but was beaten 4–3. Pinches also reached the main draw of the World Open and China Open but lost in the first round both times. Due to all 128 players on the tour earning a place in the first round of the Welsh Open, Pinches did not need to qualify and beat Nigel Bond 4–1, to set up a second round meeting with Ronnie O'Sullivan. Pinches stated before the match that he would stick to his percentage game with a defensive approach as he has always played the same no matter who the opponent is and he was defeated 4–1. Pinches had a consistent season in the European Tour events with his deepest runs being last 16 defeats at the Kay Suzanne Memorial Cup and Gdynia Open which saw him finish 49th on the Order of Merit. He dropped out of the top 64 in the rankings during the season as he ended it at number 76, but his European Tour results earned him a place on the tour for the 2014–15 and 2015–16 seasons as the sixth highest non-qualified player.

He edged out Peter Ebdon 5–4 to qualify for the 2014 Wuxi Classic, but lost 5–1 to Yan Bingtao in the first round. Pinches won three games to play in the final qualifying round for the Australian Goldfields Open where he lost 5–3 to Ebdon. He qualified for the International Championship and was beaten 6–2 by Robert Milkins in the opening round. Pinches' sole win in a ranking event this season came at the Welsh Open by defeating Jimmy White 4–3, but he was knocked out 4–2 by home favourite Mark Williams in the second round.-

Pinches had a very poor 2015–16 season as he only won two matches all year, both of these coming at the Haining Open. He was involved in two frames of note during the season. At the Ruhr Open, Pinches and Alan McManus set the record for the longest official snooker frame at 100 minutes and 24 seconds. The record stood until April 2017. In the final frame of his 4–1 defeat of Pinches in the first round of the Welsh Open, Ronnie O'Sullivan learned that the prize for making a 147 was £10,000 and decided after potting the 14th red to pot a pink and make a 146 instead as the prize money was not enough. Pinches dropped off the tour at the end of the season and he failed to regain his place on the main tour through Q School. He qualified for the 2016 Paul Hunter Classic, but lost 4–3 to Cao Yupeng in the first round.

In the 2017 Gibraltar Open, Pinches lost in the second qualifying round; however, during the 2017–18 season, having again lost in Q-School in his attempt to re-qualify for the main tour, he qualified for that season's Paul Hunter Classic. He recovered from 1–3 behind in the first round to beat Matthew Bolton 4–3, but lost in the last 64 to fellow amateur George Pragnall by the same scoreline.
On 14 October 2017 Barry entered the World Seniors Championship 1st Qualifying in Newbury for the Snooker Legends Tour. He lost 1–3 in the semi-finals to fellow amateur Matt Ford. In the frame that he won in the semi-finals he made a total clearance of 133 and won a pair of Oakley sunglasses for the highest break of the event.
He entered Q school in May 2018 in the hope of winning back his place on the main snooker tour. In the second round he was drawn against his son Luke. It was the first time a father played his son in a world snooker event since Neal Foulds played his father Geoff Foulds in 1986. Barry beat son Luke 4–1. In the following round he defeated fellow former pro Fang Xiongman.

In June 2019, Pinches came through Q-School - Event 3 by winning six matches to earn a two-year card on the World Snooker Tour for the 2019–2020 and 2020–21 seasons.

In June 2021, Pinches came through Q-School - Event 2 by winning five matches to earn a two-year card on the World Snooker Tour for the 2021–2022 and 2022–2023 seasons.

Performance and rankings timeline

Career finals

Minor-ranking finals: 2 (1 title)

Non-ranking finals: 2 (1 title)

Pro-am finals: 4 (2 titles)

Amateur finals: 5 (3 titles)

References

External links

Barry Pinches at worldsnooker.com
Profile on Global Snooker

English snooker players
1970 births
Living people
Sportspeople from Norwich
People from Old Catton